Shakedown is the debut album by English house production duo Freemasons. It was released on 21 January 2007, with the single "Rain Down Love" being released two weeks earlier in anticipation of the album. "Nothing But a Heartache", a cover of the original single by the Flirtations, was released as a digital download single on iTunes on 18 June 2007.

Background
Beyoncé's manager approached English production team Freemasons to remix "Déjà Vu" after hearing a remix they made for a song by singer Heather Headley. A club-oriented version was produced and appeared on a "Green Light" Freemasons EP, released on 31 July 2007. A maxi single, featuring the album version of the track and Freemasons club mix, was released on 5 August 2006 in European countries.

Critical reception

Their remix of "Déjà Vu" was nominated for Best Remixed Recording, Non-Classical at the 2007 Grammy Awards.

Track listing

In other media
 The song "Zap Me Lovely" was featured in a Nokia TV advert in Winter 2004, promoting a series of phones, including the Nokia 7280.

References

2007 debut albums
Freemasons (band) albums